Crazy Life is the third studio album by Anna of the North released on 4 November 2022 by Honeymoon Records.

A deluxe edition of the album will be released on 28 April 2023 by Elektra Records.

References 

2022 albums
Anna of the North albums